"Selfless" is the fifth episode of the seventh and final season of television series Buffy the Vampire Slayer.

Plot
Anya finally gets back into her old vengeance demon ways by helping a girl get revenge on an entire fraternity by having a spider demon tear their hearts out. Anya herself feels deep remorse about the event, even though Halfrek tries to encourage her to continue. Willow, returning to college, discovers the frightened and crying girl and the remains of the fraternity in the frat house, so she confronts Anya and offers her help in giving up her vengeance work; but Anya acts stubborn and defensive. When Willow tells Buffy and Xander, all three fear the worst of Anya. Buffy is determined to kill Anya; Xander, who still loves her, cannot believe Buffy could do such a thing. He claims that Buffy is hypocritical since she is so quick to kill Anya but ignored what her vampire lovers have done - Buffy reminds him that she killed Angel because it needed to be done and Xander cheered her on.

Buffy and Xander track Anya back to the frat house, where the two women fight as Xander tries to stop them. Buffy stabs Anya, seemingly killing her, but Anya's demon side prevents her from dying. Willow calls forth Anya's boss D'Hoffryn, using the talisman he gave her while trying to recruit her as Anya's replacement. When he interrupts the fight between her and Buffy, Anya begs him to reverse the spell she did – even though she knows the cost of reversing such a spell is the life and soul of a vengeance demon. Anya is ready to die, even if Xander does not want her to, but D'Hoffryn instead summons Halfrek and kills her as the price to bring back the fraternity boys, wanting Anya to live as a human and suffer through her guilt rather than die. A distraught Anya leaves and tells Xander not to follow her, wondering what her purpose is outside of their relationship now that she is mortal again.

References

External links 
 

Buffy the Vampire Slayer (season 7) episodes
2002 American television episodes
Television episodes written by Drew Goddard